Special elections were held in  on January 1, 1823, to fill vacancies in the 17th and 18th Congresses caused by the resignation of Samuel Smith (DR) after being elected to the Senate. Smith had been re-elected to the House in October.  His resignation therefore created vacancies both in the remainder of the 17th Congress and in the 18th Congress.

Election to the 17th Congress

McKim took his seat on January 8, 1823

Election to the 18th Congress

See also
List of special elections to the United States House of Representatives

References

Maryland 1823 05
Maryland 1823 05
1823 05
Maryland 05
United States House of Representatives 05
Maryland 05
January 1823 events
United States House of Representatives 1823 05